The Agnes was a wooden cutter that was wrecked when it run ashore on the New South Wales on 4 July 1865.

References

Further reading
Wrecks on the New South Wales Coast. By Loney, J. K. (Jack Kenneth), 1925–1995 Oceans Enterprises. 1993 .
Australian Shipwrecks - vol1 1622-1850, Charles Bateson, AH and AW Reed, Sydney, 1972, Call number 910.4530994 BAT
Australian shipwrecks Vol. 2 1851–1871 By Loney, J. K. (Jack Kenneth), 1925–1995. Sydney. Reed, 1980 910.4530994 LON
Australian shipwrecks Vol. 3 1871–1900 By Loney, J. K. (Jack Kenneth), 1925–1995. Geelong Vic: List Publishing, 1982 910.4530994 LON
Australian shipwrecks Vol. 4 1901–1986 By Loney, J. K. (Jack Kenneth),  1925–1995. Portarlington Vic. Marine History Publications, 1987 910.4530994 LON
Australian shipwrecks Vol. 5 Update 1986 By Loney, J. K. (Jack Kenneth),  1925–1995. Portarlington Vic. Marine History Publications, 1991 910.4530994 LON

External links
 Australian Shipping - Arrivals and Departures 1788-1968 including shipwrecks
 Encyclopedia of Australian Shipwrecks - New South Wales Shipwrecks

1851–1870 ships of Australia
Cutters of Australia
Maritime incidents in July 1865
Merchant ships of Australia
Shipwrecks of New South Wales